Xiomara Soledad Scott (died 16 July 2017) was a Venezuelan nurse killed during the 2017 protests in Venezuela.

Background 

in response to the constitutional crisis and President Nicolás Maduro's plans for a Constituent Assembly, the National Assembly called upon a referendum an act of civil disobedience, especially since the National Electoral Council and the Supreme Tribunal of Justice are not recognized in the referendum. The opposition Democratic Unity Roundtable (MUD) announced that there would be 2,030 areas for the popular consultation nationwide to serve more than 19 million voters.

Killing 
On July 16, 2017, Xiomara was on the Sucre Avenue in Catia, Caracas,  to participate in the 2017 national consultation called by the opposition. Colectivos on motorcycles passed by the voting center and shot at voters. Xiomara was wounded and transferred to the Ricardo Baquero González hospital, where she died.

The killing of Xiomara Scott was documented in a report by a panel of independent experts from the Organization of American States, considering that it could constitute a crime against humanity committed in Venezuela along with other killings during the protests.

See also 
 2017 Venezuelan protests
 Armando Cañizales
 Miguel Castillo
 Neomar Lander
 Paúl Moreno
 Jairo Ortiz
 Juan Pablo Pernalete
 Paola Ramírez
 Fabián Urbina
 David Vallenilla
 Timeline of the 2017 Venezuelan protests

References 

1950s births
2017 deaths
Deaths by firearm in Venezuela
Deaths by person in Venezuela
Female murder victims
Filmed killings
People murdered in Venezuela
2017 Venezuelan protests
Venezuelan women nurses
Violence against women in Venezuela
Year of birth uncertain
2017 murders in Venezuela
History of women in Venezuela